The West Is the Future is a 2004 album by Kid Dakota.

Track listing
"Pilgrim" (Jackson) – 3:44
"Homesteader" (Jackson) – 7:30
"Pine Ridge" (Jackson) – 4:24
"Ivan" (Jackson) – 3:36
"Ten Thousand Lakes" (Jackson) (download) – 5:06
"Starlight Motel" (Jackson) – 8:02
"Winterkill" (Brain, Jackson) – 6:05
"2001" (Jackson) – 9:48
"Atomic Pilgrim" (Jackson) – 3:23

References

2004 albums
Kid Dakota albums